Ligaria may refer to:
 Ligaria (mantis), a genus of mantises in the family Mantidae
 Ligaria (plant), a genus of plants in the family Loranthaceae